Edgars Krūmiņš (born 16 October 1985) is a Latvian basketball player for the Latvian 3x3 national team.

He represented Latvia at the 2020 Summer Olympics. Despite Krūmiņš suffering an injury late in the game, Latvia won the gold medal by defeating the Russian Olympic Committee team 21 to 18.

References

External links
 
 
 

1985 births
Living people
3x3 basketball players at the 2020 Summer Olympics
Forwards (basketball)
Guards (basketball)
Latvian expatriate basketball people in Estonia
Latvian men's basketball players
Latvian men's 3x3 basketball players
Medalists at the 2020 Summer Olympics
Olympic gold medalists for Latvia
Olympic medalists in 3x3 basketball
Olympic 3x3 basketball players of Latvia
Sportspeople from Jelgava